Daphnis dohertyi is a moth of the  family Sphingidae. It is found from Indonesia, New Guinea, the Philippines the Solomon Islands and Torres Strait.

The length of the forewings is 42–47 mm. Adults have wings with a bold pattern of pale and dark brown, with white spots at the base, the centre and the tip of each forewing. There is also a white band across the first abdominal segment.

Subspecies
Daphnis dohertyi dohertyi 
Daphnis dohertyi callusia (Rothschild & Jordan, 1916) (Solomon Islands)

References

Daphnis (moth)
Moths described in 1897